Otholobium lucens is a shrub of up to  high that is assigned to the pea family. It has alternately set clover-like leaves crowding on the new growth, while older parts have lost their leaves. The white, pea-like flowers occur with 3 or 6 together in the leaf axils. This rare species is an endemic of the Swartberg mountains in the Western Cape province of South Africa. It flowers between July and February.

Taxonomy 
A specimen of this shrub were first collected in 1907. In 2017, Charles Stirton and A. Muthama Muasya considered it sufficiently different from other Otholobium species, in particular O. polystictum, to distinguish and name it O. lucens. No synonyms are known. The name of the genus Otholobium is a combination of the Greek words ὠθέω (ōthéō) meaning to push and λοβός (lobos) meaning pod, which Stirton selected because its fruit seems to be pushed out of the calyx. The species epithet lūcēns is a Latin word meaning "shining".

Description 
It regrows from an underground rootstock after a fire destroyed the vegetation and initially produces lush, large, soft, bright green leaves. For about 10 following years the plants every year produce smaller, leathery leaves that occur on short seasonal shoots. From the rootstock emerge many stems that branch near their base, and have a cracked, yellowish-brown to black, scurfy bark. Leaves are only present on the new seasonal shoots, older leaves are discarded. The shoots are softly hairy and carry shiny, conspicuously raised glands. The leaflets are hairless, inverted egg-shaped, with a wedge-shaped base and a blunt tip, but the midvein extends beyond the leaf blade into a hooked point, while both surfaces are adorned with crater-shaped glands of different sizes in equal density, which become shiny orange when dried. These glands are raised at the lower surface. When the plants reoccur after a fire they look quite different with much larger and saft, large and bright green leaves, instead of small, leathery leaves.

The flowers occur in 1 or 2 groups of three in the axils of the leaves of the new growth. The calyx is about half as long as the corolla, is prominently ribbed and adorned with glands and soft black hair over its entire surface. As in most Faboideae, the corolla is zygomorphic, forms a specialized structure and consists of five free petals. The wider part at the top called the blade is slightly indented at the tip and extends to two hardly discernible lobes (or auricles) facing the base, and extending down between the lobes into a narrow part called claw of about 1 mm long. The wing blade is adorned with 25-50 interlocking ridges, midlength above the main vein. The wings are longer than and enclose the two bottom petals, which are together called the keel. The filament that is almost free is undulating. Fruits and seeds have not been described sofar.

Differences with related species 

Conservation, distribution and ecology 
These locations are potentially threatened by infrastructure expansion and crop cultivation. Here, the species grows in Kango Limestone Renosterveld, typically in the transition zone between sandstone and shale derived soils in the foothills of the Groot Swartberg Mountains. It occurs at  altitude. The plants usually flower between July and November, but fires will trigger flowering as late as February.

References 

Otholobium spissum
Endemic flora of South Africa
Plants described in 2017